The Metrobank Center is a  mixed-use skyscraper, located in Bonifacio Global City, Taguig, Metro Manila. It has been the tallest building in the Philippines since its completion in 2016.

Background
The Metrobank Center is part of Federal Land's Grand Central Park mixed-used complex. The Metrobank Center is connected through a common podium with the Grand Hyatt Residences, a 45-storey condominium skyscraper. The complex has a second residential tower, the Grand Hyatt Residence South Tower which stands 50-storeys high.

The Grand Hyatt Manila is a major tenant of the building. The hotel has 461 guest rooms and occupies the top 25 floors of the building. It also hosts three major restaurants namely The Grand Kitchen, No. 8 China House, and The Peak. It also has meeting and events rooms covering .

Architecture and design
Wong & Ouyang, as well as Casas Architects were the architectural firms behind the Metrobank Center. Ove Arup & Partners was responsible for the wind, structural, and seismic engineering of the building. Arup devised its damp outrigger system to make the building resistant to seismic shock and wind. Concrete outrigger walls were installed in the Metrobank Center's two mechanical floors.

History
In September 2008, Taguig Mayor Sigfrido Tiñga announced that Federal Land will be building a 66-storey skyscraper that would surpass the PBCom Tower in height which was then the tallest building in the country. The construction of the building then dubbed as the "Federal Land Tower" was scheduled to commence within 2009.

The project would be formally unveiled by Federal Land in March 2011 with the groundbreaking ceremony taking place on March 24, 2011. Initially it was projected to be completed in 2014. While the building was under construction in August 2017 there was a fire incident in it though no injuries were reported.

The marker at the hotel's lobby was unveiled in September 2017 by George Ty of Federal Land and President Rodrigo Duterte. The hotel opened on January 23, 2018.

References

Skyscrapers in Bonifacio Global City
Skyscraper office buildings in Metro Manila
Residential skyscrapers in Metro Manila
Skyscraper hotels in the Philippines
Hyatt Hotels and Resorts
Hotel buildings completed in 2017